Favarger is a Swiss chocolate making company founded by Jacques Foulquier in 1826 in Geneva. It is currently located in Versoix, Canton of Geneva, Switzerland.

History

In 1826, Jacques Foulquier, a confectioner, moved to Geneva and started a chocolate company. One of his daughters later married Jean-Samuel Favarger who took over his father in laws' company.

In 1878, the company relocated outside of Geneva, in Versoix, a small commune in the canton of Geneva. The location of the former chocolate factory is today's Batîment des Forces Motrices. 

In 1922, the company created one of their signature chocolates called Avalines. The brick chocolates combine milk and dark chocolate with praline, almonds and Madagascan vanilla.

The Favarger family ran the company until 2003. In 2003 the majority of shares of Favarger were acquired by Luka Rajic. His intention was to combine the traditional know-how of chocolate specialist Favarger with new managerial competences to develop the brand in Switzerland and abroad. 

Favarger collaborated with the Goldkenn chocolate company from its launch in 1980 until 1995.

See also
 List of bean-to-bar chocolate manufacturers

Notes and references

External links
 Official website

Swiss chocolate companies
Companies based in the canton of Geneva
Versoix
Food and drink companies established in 1826
Swiss brands
Swiss companies established in 1826